Choi Jae-ho (born March 17, 1980), known professionally as Choiza, is a South Korean hip hop recording artist. He and Gaeko comprise the hip hop duo Dynamic Duo, which rose to fame upon the release of their debut album Taxi Driver in 2004. In 2006, he co-founded the South Korean record label Amoeba Culture. He was previously a member of the hip hop trio CB Mass.

Personal life 
On September 25, 2013, Choiza and Sulli were rumored to be dating after pictures of them surfaced on the Internet. Their agencies initially denied their relationship, but later confirmed it on August 19, 2014, as other pictures of them on a date surfaced on the internet. The two ended their relationship in March 2017. Both celebrities endured malicious comments and cyberbullying throughout their public relationship, and after Sulli's death in 2019. Following Sulli's death, Choiza received malicious comments and was blamed by netizens for her death. Moreover, the cyberbullying continued after he shared a farewell message to Sulli on Instagram, forcing him to disable the comments on his account.

On February 17, 2023, Choiza announced his upcoming marriage with his non celebrity girlfriend in July 2023, after three years of dating.

Discography

Singles

References

External links

1980 births
Living people
South Korean male rappers
South Korean hip hop record producers
Sejong University alumni
Place of birth missing (living people)
Rappers from Seoul
Victims of cyberbullying